Anila Naz Chowdhury is a Bangladeshi singer who started her musical career as a part of the band Kranti. She is best known for her collaborations with Fuad al Muqtadir and her duet album Ekhon Ami with Sumon.

Music career

After Kranti disbanded, she collaborated with Fuad for his albums, and has sung at least one song in all of his albums, except one. Among them the most notable is "Ke Bashi Bajay Re". She also introduced singer Topu to Fuad, which led to their album "Bondhu Bhabo Ki". Fuad's 2015 album "Hit Factory" included her song "Itihaash".

Her duet album Ekhon Ami with Sumon became a top seller in both Bangladesh and India. The songs "Gaibona", Shopnogulo Tomar Moto", "Shobar Jonno Bhabcho Tumi" became chartbusters.
After much delays, its sequel Ekhon Ami-2 is scheduled for a July 2015 release.

Live performances
Anila performs at various international events such as Adhunika's fifth anniversary gala at New York, Fuad Live at Bangladesh China Friendship Conference Centre, Dhaka in 2008, Bangladesh Day 2009 at Chicago, AABEA Biennial Convention 2010, Indo-Bangladesh Concert 2010 by djuice at Dhaka, Serenity at Markham Theatre, Toronto, 2013, Journey of Hope by Spreeha Foundation at Bellevue, WA in 2015.

Personal life and other careers
She had worked for Microsoft Corporation as a software test engineer for couple of years between her universities. After shifting to Bangladesh, she became a lecturer at North South University, Dhaka.

Discography

References 

1979 births
Living people
21st-century Bangladeshi women singers
21st-century Bangladeshi singers
People from Dhaka